Music of the Old Serbia is a debut vinyl album by Ensemble Renaissance, released in 1983 on the PGP RTB label (also released as an audio cassette). It is also Ensemble's first album with early music of Serbia. They will revisit the theme of Serbian Medieval songs and dances on the Roots of the Balkan, and some of the material from this album will be remastered on the Music of Old Serbia - Chants from 14th to the 18th century dedicated exclusively to the Medieval Serbian chant.
The A side of the record deals with the earliest attested Serbian composers belonging to the Serbo-Byzantine musical style while the B side contains secular and ritual songs and dances.
Most of the material was taken from the books by the Serbian ethnomusicologists Dimitrije Stefanović (Old Serbian music, 1975), Živojin Stanković (Folks songs and dances from Krajina, 1946), Kosta Manojlović (Folk melodies from the Eastern Serbia, 1950), Đorđe Karaklajić (unpublished), and others.

Content
The documented musical history of the Serbs can be traced back to the medieval era. Church music was performed throughout Serbia by choirs or individual singers. The songs performed at the time were derived from the Osmoglasnik, a collection of religious songs dedicated to Jesus. These songs were repeated over the course of eight weeks in a cyclical fashion. Composers from this era include Kir Stefan the Serb, Isaiah the Serb, and Nikola the Serb.
Aside from church music, the medieval era in Serbia included traditional music, about which little is known, and music for the royal court. During the rule of the Nemanjić dynasty musicians played an important role in the royal court, and were known as sviralnici, glumci and praskavnici. The rulers known for the musical patronage included Stefan Dušan and Đurađ Branković.
With the fall of Serbia under the Ottoman rule came instruments that would further cause Serbian music to flourish.
Medieval musical instruments included horns, trumpets, lutes, psalteries, drums and cymbals. Traditional folk instruments include the gajde, kaval, dajre, diple, tamburitza, gusle, tapan (davul), sargija, ćemane (kemenche), zurla (zurna), and frula among others.

Track listing
All tracks produced by Ensemble Renaissance.
A special guest on the album is academic painter and singer Dragoslav Aksentijević-Pavle.

References

1983 albums
Ensemble Renaissance albums